The Lotus 109 was a Formula One car used by Team Lotus in the latter part of the 1994 Formula One season. It was designed by Chris Murphy who based the car on his Lotus 107 model. It was powered by a Mugen-Honda V10. Johnny Herbert was able to keep Lotus competitive in Belgium and Monza with the car, but funds were drying up and development was limited. At the end of the season, the car was retired and Team Lotus went into receivership.

Complete Formula One results
(key)

References

1994 Formula One season cars
109